Senator Mayer may refer to:

Charles F. Mayer (1795–1864), Maryland State Senate
George A. Mayer (1917–2000), Wisconsin State Senate
Robert Mayer (politician) (born 1957), Missouri State Senate
Shelley Mayer (born 1952), New York State Senate
Stephen F. Mayer (1854–1935), Wisconsin State Senate

See also
Senator Meyer (disambiguation)
Senator Meier (disambiguation)